Nuclear Research and Consultancy Group (NRG) is a Dutch institute that performs nuclear research for the government and private companies. It is the most important producer of radionuclides, such as molybdenum-99, lutetium-177 and iridium-192, in Europe and maintains and operates the Petten nuclear reactor.

The institute also offers services to medical, chemical, oil, and gas companies.

See also 
 Energy Research Centre of the Netherlands
 Institute for Energy (IE)
 EURATOM

References

External links
 NRG institute website

Nuclear research institutes in the Netherlands
Research and analysis firms